Nancy Smith may refer to:

 Nancy Smith (politician), Ottawa city councillor
 Nancy Smith (designer) (1881–1962), British designer
 Nancy Maria Smith, see List of Joseph Smith's wives
 Nancy Stark Smith (born 1952), dancer
 Nancy Murdoch (born 1969), later Smith, Scottish curler

See also 
 Nancy Banks-Smith (born 1929), British television and radio critic